Mark Dickson (born 8 December 1959) is a former professional tennis player.

Playing college tennis at Clemson University, Dickson was selected as the 1982 ITCA Senior Player of the Year. Additionally, he was named All-American in singles in 1980, 1981 and 1982. In 1981 he was also named All-American in doubles. Dickson turned pro in 1982 after becoming the first three-time All-America at Clemson University from 1980 to 1982.

As a tour pro, Dickson is best known for being a quarter-finalist in the 1983 US Open where he defeated Stefan Simonsson, Mel Purcell, Danie Visser and John Lloyd before losing to compatriot Bill Scanlon. He captured two grand prix tour titles, at Houston and Toulouse.

Born in Tampa, Florida, Dickson graduated from Jesuit High School in 1978. He lived in Sarasota, Florida while on tour.

Career finals

Singles (2 titles, 1 runner-up)

Doubles (4 titles, 5 runner-ups)

References

External links
 
 

1959 births
Living people
American male tennis players
Clemson Tigers men's tennis players
Sportspeople from Sarasota, Florida
Tennis players from Tampa, Florida
Place of birth missing (living people)
Jesuit High School (Tampa) alumni